Joe or Joseph Riley may refer to:

People 
 Joseph P. Riley Jr. (born 1943), American politician, Charleston mayor
 Joe Riley (artist) (1964–2007), American artist, special effects artist, SubGenius
 Joe Riley (ice hockey) (1923–1976), American ice hockey player
 Joseph Albert Riley (1869–1940), South Australian businessman
 Joseph Harvey Riley (1873–1941), American ornithologist, Smithsonian Institution

 Joe Riley (rugby) (1882–1950), British rugby league footballer and rugby union coach
 Joe Riley (Darlington footballer) (active 1949), English football forward with Stockton and Darlington
 Joe Riley (footballer, born 1991), English retired football full back
 Joe Riley (footballer, born 1996), English football full back or midfielder

Characters 
 Joe Riley (One Life to Live) (Lee Patterson), in TV series One Life to Live (1968–2012)
 Joe Riley (James Dunn), in the movie The Golden Gloves Story (1951)
 Joe Riley (Eddie Quillan), in the movie Jungle Raiders (1945)

See also
 Jo Riley (Josephine Riley), British writer, translator, actor, specialized in Chinese theatre
 Joe O'Reilly (disambiguation)
 Joe Reilly (disambiguation)
 Joseph P. Riley Jr. Park, a stadium in Charleston, South Carolina, U.S.
 Riley (surname), list of people with that surname